Sitobion luteum, the orchid aphid, is a species of aphid in the family Aphididae. It is found in Europe.

References

Articles created by Qbugbot
Insects described in 1876
Macrosiphini